Marco Cé (8 July 1925 – 12 May 2014) was an Italian cardinal of the Roman Catholic Church. He served as the Patriarch of Venice from 1978 to 2002 and was elevated to the cardinalate in 1979.

Biography
Marco Cé was born in Izano in 1925 to a family of farmers. He studied at the seminary in Crema and later at the Lodi lyceum and at both the Pontifical Gregorian University and the Pontifical Biblical Institute in Rome. From the Gregorian he obtained a doctorate in dogmatic theology and a licentiate in Sacred Scripture.

Cé was ordained to the priesthood by Archbishop Luigi Traglia on 27 March 1948 in the Lateran Basilica in Rome. He then returned to Crema where he served as a Professor of Scripture and as the Vice-Rector of the seminary from 1948 to 1957. He was later named rector in 1950 while continuing to teach there. He devoted his time to preach spiritual retreats to the youth of the Catholic Action and also focused on giving regular spiritual exercises to the clergy under his ward.

On 22 April 1970, Cé was appointed as the Auxiliary Bishop of Bologna and the Titular Bishop of Vulturia. He received his episcopal consecration on the following 17 May (Pentecost) from Bishop Carlo Manziana, with Archbishop Franco Costa and Bishop Placido Cambiaghi, CRSP, serving as the co-consecrators. He took as his episcopal motto "Christus ipse pax" which translates as "Christ Himself is peace". He was received in Bologna on 29 June in the cathedral of San Petronio. On 21 May 1976, he was made a chaplain to Azione Cattolica.

After the ascension of Pope John Paul I to the papacy in 1978 and his death thirty-three days later, Cé was named his successor as Patriarch of Venice by Pope John Paul II on 7 December 1978. He took canonical possession of the see on 1 January 1979 and made his official entrance into his new archdiocese on the following 7 January.

Pope John Paul II elevated him into the cardinalate on 30 June 1979 as the Cardinal-Priest of San Marco. Cé resigned as the head of his patriarchate on 5 January 2002. He was also one of the cardinal electors who participated in the 2005 papal conclave that saw the election of Pope Benedict XVI. In 2006, he was invited by Pope Benedict XVI to preach the Lenten spiritual exercises to him and the Roman Curia.

At the conclave of 2005 Cardinal Cé was the oldest of the voting cardinals.

Cardinal Cé fractured his femur in April 2014 and died at the Hospital of Ss. Giovanni e Paolo in Venice on 12 May 2014 at the age of 88.

Potential beatification
In 2015 the Patriarch of Venice Francesco Moraglia invited the Venetian people to gather documentation to start the process that would commence the cause of beatification for the late cardinal.

References

External links

Cardinals of the Holy Roman Church
Catholic-Pages
Catholic-Hierarchy

1925 births
2014 deaths
Clergy from the Province of Cremona
20th-century Italian cardinals
Patriarchs of Venice
20th-century Italian Roman Catholic archbishops
Cardinals created by Pope John Paul II
Pontifical Gregorian University alumni
Pontifical Biblical Institute alumni
21st-century Italian cardinals